Pierre-Marie-Alexis Millardet (13 December 1838 – 15 December 1902) was a French botanist and mycologist born in Montmirey-la-Ville.

He was a student at the Universities of Heidelberg and Freiberg, and later became a professor of botany at the Universities of Strasbourg (1869), Nancy (1872), and Bordeaux (1876).

Millardet is chiefly remembered for his work dealing with plant pests. In the 1860s the vineyards of France were infested by the destructive Phylloxera, an aphid-like pest inadvertently introduced to Europe from the United States. Millardet and fellow botanist Jules Émile Planchon (1823-1888) controlled the infestation by using American grape vines that were resistant to Phylloxera as grafting stock. American horticulturalist, T.V. Munson, was instrumental in identifying and provisioning the American rootstock that was resistant to Phylloxera and suitable for French growing conditions.

He was also responsible for protecting grape vineyards from downy mildew fungus (Plasmopara viticola). He accomplished this feat by implementing a fungicide consisting of hydrated lime, copper sulfate and water, a mixture that was to become known as the "Bordeaux mixture". It was the first fungicide to be used worldwide and is still used today.

Writings 
 Monographie sur la croissance de la vigne et la technique d'hybridation artificielle. - Monograph on vine growth and artificial hybridization technique.
 Un porte-greffe pour les terrains crayeux et marneux les plus chlorosant. - Rootstock for chalky terrain and marl for chlorosis.
 Notes sur les vignes américaines et opuscules divers sur le même sujet. - Notes on American vines and various pamphlets on the same subject.
 Pourridié et Phylloxéra. Etude comparative de ces deux maladies de la vigne, 1882 - Phylloxera and rot. Comparative study of these two diseases of the vine.
 Histoire des principales variétés et espèces de vignes d'origine américaine qui résistent au phylloxera, (1885) - History of the main varieties and species of American grapes that are resistant to phylloxera.

Sources 
 This article is based on a translation of equivalent articles from the French and German Wikipedia.

1838 births
1902 deaths
People from Jura (department)
19th-century French botanists
French mycologists
Academic staff of the University of Strasbourg
Academic staff of Nancy-Université
Academic staff of the University of Bordeaux